Constanze Bauer ( Gensel) is a German former competitive figure skater who represented East Germany. She is the 1984 Ennia Challenge champion, the 1985 Golden Spin of Zagreb champion, and a two-time East German national silver medalist. Gensel reached the top eight at two ISU Championships — the 1984 World Junior Championships and the 1986 European Championships. She achieved her highest World Championship placement, 11th, in 1985. She trained in Karl-Marx-Stadt (Chemnitz). Bauer later became a consultant at a bank.

Competitive highlights

References 

German female single skaters
Living people
Sportspeople from Chemnitz
Year of birth missing (living people)